Ilayathu (also written as Ilayath, Elayath, Elayathu) is a Hindu community in Kerala, India, and belong to a sect of Malayala Brahmins. The house of an Ilayath is known as Illam. The origin of this community like those of Nampoothiris and Nairs and perhaps most of the upper-class communities in Kerala is shrouded in mystery. And what remains is a few legends and traditions.

See also
 Ambalavasi

Indian castes
Kerala society
Malayali Brahmins
Social groups of Kerala